Jason Bourne is a 2016 American action-thriller film directed by Paul Greengrass and written by Greengrass and Christopher Rouse. It is the fifth installment of the Bourne film series and a direct sequel to The Bourne Ultimatum (2007). Matt Damon reprises his role as the main character, former CIA assassin Jason Bourne. In addition, the film stars Tommy Lee Jones, Alicia Vikander, Julia Stiles, Vincent Cassel, Riz Ahmed, Ato Essandoh, and Scott Shepherd.

The character Aaron Cross, from The Bourne Legacy (2012), does not appear in the film because director Greengrass wanted to focus on the title character, and because actor Jeremy Renner was unable to participate due to scheduling conflicts. In Jason Bourne, Bourne remains on the run from CIA hit squads as he tries to uncover hidden truths about his father, while CIA director Robert Dewey (Jones) orders the head of cyber-security Heather Lee (Vikander) to hunt him down. Principal photography on the film commenced on September 8, 2015.

Jason Bourne premiered in London on July 11, 2016, and was theatrically released in the U.S. by Universal Pictures on July 29, 2016. A 3D version was also released in limited Asian countries, namely China, India, the Philippines, and Vietnam. The film received mixed reviews and grossed $415 million worldwide.

Plot
Twelve years after exposing Blackbriar, ex-CIA agent and Treadstone operative Jason Bourne has finally recovered from his amnesia, isolating himself from the world and making a living as a street fighter in Greece. In Reykjavík, Treadstone technician Nicky Parsons, who has been collaborating with a hacktivist group led by Christian Dassault, hacks into the CIA's server to expose its black ops programs. In the process, Parsons finds documentation concerning Bourne's recruitment into Treadstone and his father's role in the program. She travels to Athens to inform him. 

Parsons' information breach alerts Heather Lee, the CIA’s cybersecurity operations division head, and CIA Director Robert Dewey. They send teams after Bourne and Parsons, who have arranged to meet in Greece at Syntagma Square during an anti-government protest. Dewey also sends the Asset, an ex-Blackbriar operative who was captured and tortured in Syria as an unintentional consequence of Bourne's exposure of Blackbriar. Parsons is shot by the Asset, and the key to a locker holding the CIA files falls out of her hand, which Bourne takes.

Seeking answers about his past and family, Bourne locates Dassault in Berlin. Dassault decrypts Parsons' files, and Bourne discovers that his father Richard Webb was a CIA analyst involved in the creation of the Treadstone program. A malware program implanted in the files gives the CIA Bourne's location while Lee remotely erases the files. Dassault attacks Bourne, but is incapacitated.

Lee secretly alerts Bourne to the CIA team closing in. She believes that he can be persuaded to return to the agency after seeing his behavior report. After avoiding the team, Bourne tracks Malcolm Smith, an ex-Treadstone operative, in London and arranges to meet him in Paddington Plaza. Meanwhile, Lee persuades Dewey's boss, Edwin Russell, the National Intelligence Director, to allow her to contact Bourne in person and attempt to bring him back in. Dewey, who opposes her plan, secretly instructs the Asset to eliminate her team and kill Bourne.

Bourne confronts Smith, who confesses that Webb was not just an analyst for Treadstone but played a significant role in creating it; Webb threatened to expose the program when he discovered that Dewey sent agents to recruit Bourne, as he didn't want his son to become one of their assassins. The Asset killed Webb under Dewey's orders in Beirut, framing it as a terrorist attack to incentivize Bourne to join Treadstone. The Asset interrupts and kills Smith when Bourne uses him as a human shield, and then Bourne escapes. He locates Lee, who admits she is uncomfortable with Dewey's methods and directs Bourne to a convention in Las Vegas.

Dewey is scheduled to attend a public debate with Aaron Kalloor, CEO of social media giant Deep Dream. Kalloor is the public face of corporate social responsibility in the Internet age, but was secretly funded by Dewey in the startup stage. Dewey intends to use Deep Dream for real-time mass surveillance alongside the latest incarnation of the CIA's targeted assassination "Beta" program, a more ruthless version of Blackbriar in which the assassin can murder anyone to get to the target. However, Kalloor has started having second thoughts about giving the CIA access to Deep Dream.

Dewey authorizes the Asset to assassinate Kalloor and Lee, having discovered that she is helping Bourne. Bourne thwarts the assassinations and confronts Dewey in his suite. Dewey attempts to stage an ambush, but is killed by Lee, whose involvement in Dewey's death is covered up by Bourne. Bourne pursues the Asset, and the pair ends up crashing into the Riviera casino. Bourne chases the Asset down into the sewers and engage in a fight that ends with Bourne killing the Asset.

Lee, whose involvement in Dewey's death was covered up, volunteers herself to Russell as the new CIA director. She outlines her plan to bring Bourne back to the agency, but is prepared to kill him if he refuses. Lee meets with Bourne, who says he will consider the offer. Lee returns only to realize Bourne had her and Russell's conversation recorded, indicating he was aware of her true intentions, as he disappears again.

Cast

 Matt Damon as David Webb / Jason Bourne, a former CIA assassin who disappeared after publicizing details of the CIA's targeted assassination programs.
 Tommy Lee Jones as Robert Dewey, the current director of the CIA and leader of the Iron Hand program who intends to take down Bourne after the exposure of Blackbriar
 Alicia Vikander as Heather Lee, head of the CIA Cyber Ops Division.
 Vincent Cassel as The Asset, a Blackbriar assassin working for the Iron Hand program. The Asset was captured in Syria while undercover and tortured as a result of Bourne's actions and harbours resentment toward him because of it.
 Julia Stiles as Nicolette "Nicky" Parsons, Bourne's former Treadstone contact in Paris.
 Riz Ahmed as Aaron Kalloor, CEO of Deep Dream.
 Ato Essandoh as Craig Jeffers, a CIA agent and Dewey's right-hand man.
 Scott Shepherd as Edwin Russell, Director of National Intelligence.
 Bill Camp as Malcolm Smith, a former CIA analyst who retired to the private sector.
 Vinzenz Kiefer as Christian Dassault, a hacker, whistleblower, and the leader of a group of privacy activists.
 Stephen Kunken as Baumen, a Deep Dream employee who is Kalloor's assistant.
 Gregg Henry as Richard Webb, Jason Bourne's father and creator of the original Treadstone program, who was murdered by the Asset.

Production

Development
In May 2007, prior to the release of The Bourne Ultimatum, Matt Damon stated that he would not be interested in returning for a fourth Bourne film, remarking of his participation in the Bourne franchise: "We have ridden that horse as far as we can." Damon said in August 2007:

Instead The Bourne Legacy was released in the U.S. on August 10, 2012 with Jeremy Renner replacing Damon as the star. Despite getting mixed reviews Universal noted that they planned to continue with the series, with Damon and Paul Greengrass later expressing interest in returning.

On September 15, 2014, it was announced that Damon and Greengrass would indeed return for the next Bourne film. In November 2014, Damon confirmed that he and Greengrass would return, with a script from themselves, with Christopher Rouse editing. On May 23, 2015, Deadline Hollywood reported that Alicia Vikander was in talks to star with Damon in the fifth film. On June 19, 2015, Deadline reported that Julia Stiles had confirmed she would be reprising the role of Nicky Parsons in the film, a character she had previously played in the first three films. Viggo Mortensen was in talks to play the villain role. On June 23, 2015, Vikander was confirmed to star in the sequel, while she was also in talks for the Assassin's Creed film, which she passed on. On July 28, 2015, Tommy Lee Jones joined the film's cast to play a senior CIA officer. On September 1, 2015, Vincent Cassel was cast in the film as an assassin who tracks Bourne. On September 15, 2015, The Hollywood Reporter confirmed that actor Ato Essandoh was cast in the film as an unspecified character. On October 20, 2015, Scott Shepherd was added to the cast to play the deputy director of the CIA. On November 4, 2015, Variety confirmed that Riz Ahmed had signed on to play the role of a tech specialist working with the CIA.

Filming
Principal photography on the film commenced on September 8, 2015. In late November 2015, filming took place in Kreuzberg, Berlin. In early December 2015, filming started in Washington, D.C., where shooting took place at Constitution Gardens. Filming in Las Vegas, Nevada was scheduled to begin on January 14, 2016, lasting until January 21. Filming also took place at stages F and H at Leavesden Studios. The Leavesden set was used as the CIA hub space in the film. Production on the film concluded on February 1, 2016.

Release
On January 6, 2015, Universal set the film's United States release date as July 29, 2016. The first trailer for the film was aired on February 7, 2016, during Super Bowl 50 and revealed the title of the film. The film was released in the United Kingdom on July 27, 2016. It was released in 2D and IMAX 3D in select international territories only, using DMR.

Home media
Jason Bourne was released on Digital HD and on Blu-ray/DVD December 6, 2016, by Universal Pictures Home Entertainment.

Soundtrack

The soundtrack to Jason Bourne, as composed by John Powell and David Buckley, and additional music by Batu Sener, was released digitally on July 29, 2016, by Back Lot Music. A new version of Moby's "Extreme Ways", entitled "Extreme Ways (Jason Bourne)", was recorded for the film's end credits.

Track listing
 "I Remember Everything" – 2:04
 "Backdoor Breach" – 3:50
 "Converging in Athens" – 4:13
 "Motorcycle Chase" – 6:53
 "A Key to the Past" – 2:37
 "Berlin" – 2:02
 "Decrypted" – 5:34
 "Flat Assault" – 2:39
 "Paddington Plaza" – 6:46
 "White Van Plan" – 2:49
 "Las Vegas" – 3:48
 "Following the Target" – 3:29
 "Strip Chase" – 4:59
 "An Interesting Proposal" – 2:13
 "Let Me Think About It" – 2:24
 "Extreme Ways (Jason Bourne)" by Moby – 4:56

Reception

Box office
Jason Bourne became a commercial success, with a modest budget compared to its final gross. The film grossed $162.4 million in the United States and Canada and $253.1 million in other countries for a worldwide total of $415.5 million, against a production budget of $120 million.

The film passed the $400 million threshold on October 7, making it the second film in the Bourne franchise to reach this milestone and the second highest-grossing film in the series behind The Bourne Ultimatum. Worldwide, the film opened at number one in 50 markets, scoring the biggest debut in the franchise in 53 markets. In 51 territories, Jason Bourne is the highest-grossing film in the franchise. It is the third highest-grossing film of 2016 (behind Warcraft and The Mermaid) that is not about comic book superheroes or anthropomorphic animals (including The Jungle Book).

United States and Canada
In the United States and Canada, Jason Bourne was projected to gross $50–60 million in its opening weekend. It made $4.2 million from Thursday night previews at 2,928 theaters which began at 7:00pm, becoming the first film in the series to earn above $1 million from previews, although the other four films' screenings began at midnight. On its opening day it grossed $22.8 million, which is the second biggest opening day of the series behind The Bourne Ultimatum ($24.6 million). It topped the box office in its opening weekend as expected with a $59.2 million opening, making it one of the few franchise titles from 2016 to open on par with its predecessor. It is the second biggest opening for the franchise as well as for Damon, just behind the $69 million debut of The Bourne Ultimatum in 2007. The film dropped by 71% on its second Friday ($6.5 million) as a result of the release of the superhero film Suicide Squad. By comparison, the last four Bourne movies all dropped (respectively) 46%, 59%, 57% and 61% on their second Fridays. In its second weekend the film grossed $22.7 million (a drop of 61.6%), finishing second at the box office.

Other territories
Internationally, Jason Bourne is the highest-grossing film of the series and has secured a release in a total of 78 countries. The film opened day-and-date in conjuncture with its North American release across 46 territories, including Australia, Brazil, South Korea and the U.K. and Ireland. It grossed $22.8 million on its opening day, marking the biggest international opening day for the franchise. It had No. 1 opening days in 28 markets and recorded the biggest opening day for the franchise in the United Kingdom and Ireland ($5.2 million). Through Sunday, July 31, it had an opening weekend total of $50.7 million easily topping the box office as well as debuting at first place in 27 of the 48 markets and scored the best international opening for the franchise. After three weeks of fluctuating up and down the charts, it rose back to the top spot in its fourth weekend after a strong debut in China.

It recorded the biggest opening for the franchise in South Korea ($11.3 million), the United Kingdom ($10.2 million), Australia ($5.8 million) Japan ($4.4 million) and Russia ($2.1 million) and had number one openings in France ($3.4 million), Australia, Taiwan ($2 million), Spain ($1.9 million), Indonesia ($1.7 million), the Philippines ($1.5 million) the Netherlands ($1.5 million), Mexico ($1.5 million), the UAE ($1.2 million), Sweden ($1.1 million) and Singapore ($1.1 million).

Brazil was one of the markets that did not open in first place, instead opening in fourth place with $1.4 million. South Korea posted the biggest opening among all other countries and although it faced stiff competition from local titles – Operation Chromite and Train to Busan – debuted in third place. Its opening figure is nevertheless a franchise milestone and comes ahead of competitions like Spectre and Furious 7. Similarly, in the United Kingdom and Ireland, it finished in second place after facing competition with the animated Finding Dory. It had a £7.6 million ($10 million) debut including £2.29 million ($3 million) worth of previews from 563 theaters, a new record for the franchise. However, based on pure Friday to Sunday earnings with the exclusion of previews, the film's £5.31 ($6.98 million) is more or less at par with The Bourne Ultimatums £5.31 million ($7 million). In just 10 days, it became the second highest-grossing film in the series there. In India, it debuted in second place for a non-local film behind Suicide Squad with $1.1 million.

In China, the film was released on Tuesday, August 23, alongside the animated Ice Age: Collision Course and received an exclusive 3D version. It grossed an estimated $12.3  million on its opening day to record the franchise's best opening day there (other Chinese sources had it at $11.8 million). By comparison, The Bourne Legacy made $12.7 there in four days. In three days, it earned $25.1 million. In total, it delivered a six-day opening weekend total of an estimated $49.1 million – and a Friday to Sunday total of $23.9 million – to record the biggest opening for the franchise there. Its opening numbers alone surpassed the lifetime total of all other Jason Bourne films there. While it had a robust opening, compared to other Hollywood films that also opened on a Tuesday, such as Mission: Impossible – Rogue Nation (Friday +18%, Saturday +68%) and Avengers: Age of Ultron (Friday +37%, Saturday +88%), Jason Bournes box office jumps on its first Friday and Saturday were just 13% and 43% respectively. Following a first-place finish, it fell precipitously by 92% in its second weekend, earning $3.8 million. China Film Insider projected that the film will end its run with a total of around $82 million, and also pointed out that had Universal not scheduled its release with Ice Age: Collision Course, the film could've grossed over $100 million. But the film ended up making $66.3 million.

Following North America and China, the U.K. is the film's top earning international market with $30.4 million, followed by South Korea with $19.1 million and Australia with $16.7 million and France with $11.6 million.

Critical response
Review aggregation website Rotten Tomatoes gave the film an approval rating of 54% based on 324 reviews, with a weighted average score of 5.80/10. The website's critical consensus states, "Jason Bourne delivers fans of the franchise more of what they've come to expect – which is this sequel's biggest selling point as well as its greatest flaw." Metacritic gave the film a normalized score of 58 out of 100, based on 50 critics, indicating "mixed or average reviews".  Audiences polled by CinemaScore gave the film an average grade of "A−" on an A+ to F scale.

Mike Ryan of Uproxx gave the film a mixed review, writing: "Jason Bourne is a completely unnecessary sequel that barely moves along the plot from the third movie. And after what a Big Deal it was in The Bourne Legacy that no one could find Jason Bourne, it does feel a bit weird that the return of Jason Bourne seems so anticlimactic." Chris Tilly of IGN gave the film 7/10, saying: "Jason Bourne has a passable plot and a couple of pulsating sequences, which already makes it better than the majority of action movies. But in the context of its predecessors, that isn't good enough, the new movie never fully escaping the shadow of that previous trilogy, and making you question the wisdom of drawing Bourne back out of the shadows at all."

A. O. Scott of The New York Times described Damon's performance as being "as subdued as ever" and said: "[t]his is perhaps the most striking feature of Jason Bourne: Virtually all the major characters—good, bad and in-between—work for the same organization, at least on a consulting basis. There are dark whispers about external threats, and invocations of the tension between security and privacy in the digital age, but geopolitics and technology are scaffolding for what is essentially a movie about human resources challenges in a large bureaucracy." Peter Debruge of Variety said, "[i]n many ways, Jason Bourne is the most unsettling movie in the series, seeing as it points to a vast conspiracy directed at the American people, and Greengrass's style—rendered visceral via the marriage of Barry Ackroyd's on-the-fly lensing, a tense techno score, and Rouse's cutting-room trickery—lends itself nicely to an era in which shadow forces rely on such tools as satellite surveillance and facial recognition software." He went on by saying, "just as the initial Damon-driven trilogy wrapped up Bourne's business but left us wanting more, this sequel offers closure even as it entices us with the possibility of his return."

Richard Roeper of the Chicago Sun-Times  gave the film three and a half out of four stars,  describing Damon's performance as being, "outstanding as the tightly wound, perpetually restless and conflicted Jason Bourne, who is practically a superhero when it comes to fighting but is utterly lost the rest of the time", and said: "Jason Bourne is the best action thriller of the year so far, with a half-dozen terrific chase sequences and fight scenes. At one point the action swings to Vegas, and while some of what transpires is almost cartoonishly over-the-top, it's great fun." Todd McCarthy of The Hollywood Reporter found the film's conclusion and the characters distasteful, writing: "unfortunately, then, the film ends on a flat, unimpressive note, as well as with the realization that, no matter how much time we've spent with them, the characters remain utterly one-dimensional", but went on by saying, "technically and logistically, Greengrass delivers everything you expect from him; there's no one better when it comes to staging complex, chaotic action amid the real life of big cities. As before, cinematographer Barry Ackroyd is a great asset in this regard, and all production and effects hands join seamlessly in the achieved goal of physical verisimilitude."

Accolades

Future
Frank Marshall said Universal Pictures is hoping to plan a sequel to Jason Bourne, making it the sixth Bourne film. He also stated that an upcoming film would expand the Bourne universe. However, in March 2017, Matt Damon cast doubt upon a sequel, hinting that people "might be done" with the character, but previously stated he would be up to work with Jeremy Renner on a Bourne film, "If they could find a way". In September 2019, Ben Smith, the producer of the Treadstone television series, confirmed that another movie was "definitely" in the works and that it would be in the same universe as the TV show.

See also
 List of films set in Las Vegas

References

External links

 
 
 
 

2016 films
2016 action thriller films
American action thriller films
American sequel films
Bourne (film series)
Films directed by Paul Greengrass
Films produced by Matt Damon
Films produced by Frank Marshall
Films set in 1999
Films set in 2016
Films set in Athens
Films set in Greece
Films set in Berlin
Films set in Rome
Films set in the Las Vegas Valley
Films set in London
Films set in Reykjavík
Films shot at Warner Bros. Studios, Leavesden
Films shot in Berlin
Films shot in the Canary Islands
Films shot in Greece
Films shot in Athens
Films shot in the Las Vegas Valley
Films shot in London
Films shot in Washington, D.C.
Films about United States Army Special Forces
IMAX films
Universal Pictures films
The Kennedy/Marshall Company films
American films about revenge
Malware in fiction
Films scored by John Powell
Films scored by David Buckley
Perfect World Pictures films
2010s English-language films
Films set in Fairfax County, Virginia
2010s American films